Igor Andreyevich Zazroyev (born 23 October 1948) is a Russian professional football coach and a former player.

External links
 

1948 births
Living people
Soviet footballers
FC Spartak Vladikavkaz players
FC SKA Rostov-on-Don players
FC Akhmat Grozny players
Soviet football managers
Russian football managers
FC Spartak Vladikavkaz managers
FC Elista managers
Association football midfielders